Kaulage       कौलगे     is a village in Gadhinglaj Taluka in Kolhapur district of Maharashtra state India. The village is 10km away from Gadhinglaj. It is located on the Gadhinglaj-Ajara national highway  548 h and on the bank of Hiranyakeshi River.  Dr.Prakash Shripad Shahapur  The President of God sakhar Harali

References

Villages in Kolhapur district